Françoise Ozanne-Rivierre (1941–2007) was a French linguist based at LACITO–CNRS, internationally known for her work on the languages of New Caledonia.

She completed her doctorate in linguistics in 1973, with a dissertation titled Le iaai, langue mélanésienne d'Ouvéa (Nouvelle-Calédonie), at Université Paris III, where she was a student of Haudricourt and Hagège. She became a member of the CNRS in 1972 and joined LACITO in 1976, where she remained until her retirement in 2006.

She published extensively on several New Caledonian languages, especially Iaai; the various languages of Hienghène (Fwâi, Pije, Jawe, Nemi); Fagauvea; and Nyelâyu. She was known for her work on Austronesian comparative linguistics, in particular for the application of the comparative method to the study of Oceanic languages.

Her husband,  (1938-2018), was also a linguist working on the languages of New Caledonia.

External links
 
 Homage to Françoise Ozanne-Rivierre and Jean-Claude Rivierre, 2020, Journal de la Société des océanistes.
 Field recordings created by F. Ozanne-Rivierre in various languages of New Caledonia, and archived in the Pangloss Collection of CNRS.

Selected publications
 .
 .
 .
 .

References 

Linguists from France
Women linguists
1941 births
2007 deaths
20th-century linguists